Proterix is an extinct genus of hedgehog-like insectivore from the Late Oligocene to the Early Miocene of North America.

Description
Proterix was an armor-headed burrowing insectivore. Although it was speculated to be limbless in a popular science book, very little of the post-cranial skeleton has been found, which is typical for mammals.  The original reference suggests reduced limbs may be possible, due to the unusually high number of lumbar vertebrae, but cautions that conclusions must be reserved until a complete skeleton is found.

References

Oligocene mammals of North America
Miocene mammals of North America
Erinaceidae